Pavel Coruț (17 June 1949 – 28 October 2021) was a Romanian writer and Security intelligence officer. He wrote, among other things, about his experience as an intelligence and counterintelligence officer in Romania. His most popular books are Quinta spartă (Broken Quintet) and Fulgerul albastru ("Blue Lightning") of the Octogonul ("The Octagon") series.

Born in Glăvănești, Iași County, Coruț worked as an intelligence officer until 1990, when he was pensioned at 39-year-old by then Defense Minister, general Nicolae Militaru. After a period of being a journalist, signing as Paul Cernescu, Coruț became a full-time writer. He has written 170 books so far (by the end of February 2017), including fantasy novels and life-guiding books.

Bibliography

Octogonul

 Quinta spartă
 Fulgerul albastru
 Floarea de Argint
 Balada Lupului Alb
 Dincolo de frontiere
 Să te naști sub steaua noastră!
 Lumina Geto Daciei
 Cântecul nemuririi
 Singuri sub Crucea Nordului
 Neînfrânții
 Călător pe drum de aştri
 A înflorit Speranța
 Întoarcerea lui Zamolxe
 Fiul Geto-Daciei
 Tărâmul fericirii
 Comoara Nibelungilor
 Secretele exploratorilor astrali
 Drumul învingătorilor
 Război în ceruri
 Expediția Cap Univers
 Născuți pentru a învinge
 Inimă de Român
 Copii Speranței
 Good bye, Nato, mon amour!
 Sfârșitul imperiului ascuns
 Omul din Carpați
 Războiul zeilor
 Victoria Alcorilor
 Pacea Marilor Străbuni
 Moartea zeilor străini
 Poarta viitorului
 Vânătorii de sioniști
 Glasul Omului
 Trăsnetul Geto-Dac
 Coroana Ariană
 Victoria Zeilor Albi
 Triumful Oamenilor
 Revanșa
 Sângele Europei
 Lumina coboară în Carpați
 Oamenii trec de absolut
 Speranțele nu mor niciodată
 Noi trăim in viitor
 Eu, Varain din Neamul Arienilor
 Europeni, uniți-vă!
 Viața merge înainte...
 Riposta Creatorilor
 Când mor uitările din noi...
 Viața oamenilor creatori
 Sfârșit de zbucium
 Cristalul de foc
 Navigăm printre enigme
 Un fulger sfâșie bezna
 Să-n vie Focul Vieții!
 Chemarea Nemărginirii
 Călăuza Alcoro-Vegană
 Planeta fericiților
 Pumnul de oțel
 Sfântă ramură de OM
 Lumina Omenirii
 Treziți Eroii Civilizatori!
 Mai tari decât destinul
 Rupeți lanțurile robiei!
 Zburăm cu Viața
 Veghetorii ies din umbră
 Extratereștrii coboară printre oameni
 Sfârșitul marii rătăciri
 Vise de viață omenească
 Cu mintea rece și inima caldă
 Lumini ce cresc în oameni
 Vin salvatorii!
 Și cresc speranțele din noi
 Prin viitorul netrăit
 Conducătorii din Carpați
 Legea și forța
 Teroarea
 Urmașii zeilor	
 Conspirația spaimei și a urii
 Incursiune în tărâmul uitat
 Noi vom renaște dintr-un vis
 Oamenii lui Zamolxe
 Destin de daimon
 Suflete de foc
 Ziua Zeilor
 Stăpânii din umbră
 Profeții imperiului ocult
 Suflete cutezătoare
 Fantomele imperiului
 Oameni contra bestii
 Sămânța creatorilor
 Taina muntelui ascuns
 Noi suntem ținta
 Cavalerii nobilei bresle

Succesul (The Success)
	Cheile succesului
	Arta succesului la Români
	Arta creației
	Cartea adolescentului
	Ghidul vieții sănătoase
	Leacuri de suflet pentru fete și femei
	Curs practic de arta succesului
	Farmec feminin
	Clanul învingătorilor
	Faceți avere!
	Cartea părinților
	Vom trăi omenește!
       Către culmile succesului (formula fericirii)
       Arta succesului pentru copii
       Cartea Creatorilor
       Secretele vârstelor de aur (tineri, activi și fericiți de la 20 la 90 de ani)
       Îngeri rebeli (carte pentru adolescenți inteligenți)

Romance
 Să vii ca o părere ...
 Ne-om întâlni în Cer
 Vara ultimei iubiri
 Flacăra iubirii
 Dragoste și otravă
 Iubirile unui marinar
 Noaptea teilor vrăjiți
 Sărutul de foc

Poetry
 Descântece din neamul Geto-Dacilor
 Vraja nopților albastre
 Cântece Daco-Române
 Parodii politico-religioase

Analysis of religious myth
 Eva n-a fost mama noastră
 Marile secrete
 Mântuirea de după Cumplita Rătăcire

Autobiography
 Un om

Historic novels
 Ultimul mag

Origins
 Codul lui Zamolxe
 Luptele Zeilor
 Calea Sperantei

References

1949 births
2021 deaths
Romanian writers
Securitate officers
People from Iași County